Pakistan Broadcasters Association (PBA); is a private association of television and radio broadcasters in Pakistan. It was established on September 23, 2005 at a meeting in Karachi. Mir Shakil ur Rehman, founder of the association, was elected as the first chairman of association. Mian Amer Mahmood (Dunya TV) is current chairman of PBA.

History 
Pakistan Broadcasters Association (PBA) was established on September 23, 2005 in a meeting of founding members including Mir Shakil-ur-Rahman of GEO TV, Ghazanfar Ali of Indus TV, A. Rauf of ARY, A. Jabbar of ATV, Aslam Kazi of KTN, Ahmed Zubairi and Asif Zubairi of Aaj TV, Imran Mehboob of Hum TV, Dr Karim of Sindh TV, Arshad Anis of AVT Khyber, Agha Nasir of FM101, Arshad Khan of PTV, Mohsin Naqvi of CNN, Abid Shaikh of Filmazia, Muhammad Asim of Business Plus, Zaheer Khan of FM91 and TV1, Meimoona Siddiqi, Muhammad Zaki, Shahid Javed, Mehdi Raza of FM107, Waseem Ahmed of FM99, Afaq Haider of FM105, Syed Sajjad H. Shah of APNA TV, Akbar Bhutto of FM91, FM92 and FM93 and Dr Rafat of FM96. They elected the founder of the association, Mir Shakil ur Rehman as the first chairman of PBA. Additionally Rehman headed an ad-hoc committee which selected five members to formulate rules and regulations of the Association.

Members 
Member channels of PBA are divided into two main types.

Television 
Members of television category are further divided into subcategories of Permanent members, members, associate members, affiliate members.

Radio 
Members of radio category are further categorized into members and associate members.

See also 
Pakistan Federal Union of Journalists
All Pakistan Newspapers Society

References 

Pakistani journalism organisations